Wherrett is a surname. Notable people with the surname include:

 Peter Wherrett (1936–2009), Australian motoring and motor sport journalist and race car driver
 Richard Wherrett (1940–2001), Australian theatrical director